Methylmalonyl CoA epimerase (methylmalonyl-CoA racemase, methylmalonyl coenzyme A racemase, DL-methylmalonyl-CoA racemase, 2-methyl-3-oxopropanoyl-CoA 2-epimerase [incorrect]) is an enzyme involved in fatty acid catabolism that is encoded in human by the "MCEE" gene located on chromosome 2. It is routinely and incorrectly labeled as "methylmalonyl-CoA racemase". It is not a racemase because the CoA moiety has 5 other stereocenters.

Structure 

The "MCEE" gene is located in the 2p13 region and contains 4 exons, and encodes for a protein that is approximately 18 kDa in size and located to the mitochondrial matrix. Several natural variants in amino acid sequences exist. The structure of the MCEE protein has been resolved by X-ray crystallography at 1.8-angstrom resolution.

Function 
The MCEE gene encodes an enzyme that interconverts D- and L- methylmalonyl-CoA during the degradation of branched-chain amino acids, odd chain-length fatty acids, and other metabolites. In biochemistry terms, it catalyzes the reaction that converts (S)-methylmalonyl-CoA to the (R) form. This enzyme catalyses the following chemical reaction

 (S)-methylmalonyl-CoA  (R)-methylmalonyl-CoA

Methylmalonyl CoA epimerase plays an important role in the catabolism of fatty acids with odd-length carbon chains.  In the catabolism of even-chain saturated fatty acids, the β-oxidation pathway breaks down fatty acyl-CoA molecules in repeated sequences of four reactions to yield one acetyl CoA per repeated sequence.  This means that, for each round of β-oxidation, the fatty acyl-Co-A is shortened by two carbons.  If the fatty acid began with an even number of carbons, this process could break down an entire saturated fatty acid into acetyl-CoA units.  If the fatty acid began with an odd number of carbons, however, β-oxidation would break the fatty acyl-CoA down until the three carbon propionyl-CoA is formed.  In order to convert this to the metabolically useful succinyl-CoA, three reactions are needed.  The propionyl-CoA is first carboxylated to (S)-methylmalonyl-CoA by the enzyme Propionyl-CoA carboxylase.  Methylmalonyl CoA epimerase then catalyzes the rearrangement of (S)-methylmalonyl-CoA to the (R) form in a reaction that uses a vitamin B12 cofactor and a resonance-stabilized carbanion intermediate.  The (R)-methylmalonyl-CoA is then converted to succinyl-CoA in a reaction catalyzed by methylmalonyl-CoA mutase.

Acting as a general base, the enzyme abstracts a proton from the β-carbon of (R)-methylmalonyl-CoA.  This results in the formation of a carbanion intermediate in which the α-carbon is stabilized by resonance.  The enzyme then acts as a general acid to protonate the β-carbon, resulting in the formation of (S)-methylmalonyl-CoA.

Clinical significance 

Mutations in the MCEE gene causes methymalonyl-CoA epimerase deficiency (MCEED), a rare autosomal recessive inborn error of metabolism in amino acid metabolisms involving branched-chain amino acids valine, leucine, and isoleucine. Patients with MCEED may present with life-threatening neonatal metabolic acidosis, hyperammonemia, feeding difficulties, and coma.

References

External links 
 

EC 5.1.99